Bill Boorne (1899–1974) was a theatre critic and journalist who wrote a column for London's Evening News and its successor, the Evening Standard.

Boorne was educated at Emanuel School, London, England.

He retired from the Evening Standard in 1967: he had worked for the paper for 30 years, including 20 years as the show business correspondent.

He appeared as a castaway on the BBC Radio programme Desert Island Discs on 19 February 1968.

Boorne was associated with the Northcliffe Golfing Society.

He died at Haywards Heath in 1974 aged 75.

References 

Place of birth missing
British theatre critics
London Evening Standard people
People educated at Emanuel School
1899 births
1974 deaths